Miss Universe 1969, the 18th Miss Universe pageant, was held on 19 July 1969 at the Miami Beach Auditorium in Miami Beach, Florida, United States. Gloria Diaz of the Philippines was crowned by Martha Vasconcellos of Brazil at the end of the event. Diaz became the first Filipino and second Southeast Asian to win the pageant beating 60 other contestants from all around the world.

Results

Placements

Special Awards

Contestants

Notes

Withdrawals 

 
 
  Okinawa

Returns 

  Replacements 

 ''' - Sabrina Loo

General references

References

1969
1969 in Florida
1969 beauty pageants
Beauty pageants in the United States
Events in Miami Beach, Florida
July 1969 events in the United States